Cheppu is a 1987 Indian Malayalam-language action thriller film directed by Priyadarshan and starring Mohanlal. This film was a huge hit. An English song in the movie, "Free and Young" was sung by famous American singer Brenda Lee. The film is based on the 1982 Canadian film Class of 1984.

Plot 
Ramachandran (Mohanlal) gets a job as an English lecturer in T. K. P. Memorial College, only to find that many students are involved in drugs and politics, led by young Ranjith Mathews (Ganesh Kumar), son of Mathews (Prathapachandran), who is an MP. Ramachandran helps some students, including a geek named Anandan who was beaten by Ranjith's gang. The halls of the school are covered with graffiti. As  Ramachandran gets to know the school and the area, Ranjith and his gang continue making trouble. One day when Ranjith and his gang are smoking drugs, they hear Ramachandran coming in. They leave the drugs and claim that they had done nothing wrong. Then one of their gang members, in the toxication of drugs climbs the flag pole and falls down and dies. Ram demands investigation on the matter as he knows he was on drugs due to Ranjith. But the police and college staff are corrupt. Then Ranjith and his gang beat up Anandan who is a friend of the dead student and who was also present at the scene. But Ramachandran saves him in the nick of time. As revenge, Ranjith and his gang kill Professor Varkey's animals in his lab, which makes him go mad. Ram and Ranjith wind up in a bathroom alone together. Ranjith throws himself into a mirror and beats himself, claiming that Ram attacked him. Trying to clear things up, Ram visits Ranjith's mother at home. Frustrated when Ranjith still plays the victim and his mother will not hear Ram out, he hotwires Ranjith's car and drives it into a wall.

Ramachandran continues fighting against Ranjith until he is murdered by his gang in the end. Ananthan later kills Ranjith for his honour.

Cast 
 Mohanlal as Ramachandran
 Cochin Haneefa as Inspector Santhosh
 K. B. Ganesh Kumar as Ranjith
 Lizy as Nancy
 Roshni as Alice Thomas
 Prathapachandran as Mathews
 Sankaradi as Karunakaran Nair
 M. G. Soman as Sathyadas, Principal
 Sulakshana as Lakshmi
 Nedumudi Venu as Prof. Varkey
 Jagathy Sreekumar as Kannan, Canteen Owner

Soundtrack 
The music was composed by Raghu Kumar and the lyrics were written by Poovachal Khader.

References

External links 
 

1980s Malayalam-language films
1987 films
Films scored by Raghu Kumar
Films directed by Priyadarshan